Winged Girl of Knossos is a children's historical novel by Erick Berry. Set in Bronze Age Crete, it is based on Greek mythology, Cretan history, and archaeological findings. The central character is Inas, the daughter of the inventor Daidalos. The novel, illustrated by the author, was first published in 1933 and was a Newbery Honor recipient in 1934.

References

1933 American novels
Children's historical novels
American children's novels
Newbery Honor-winning works
Novels set in ancient Greece
1933 children's books